Towe Jaarnek, (born 13 June 1965) is a Swedish singer. At the Swedish Melodifestivalen 1991, she performed the song Ett liv med dej, which finished 2nd. In 1992, she recorded a duet with the Swedish singer Peter Jöback. The song was More Than a Game, which was the official song for the 1992 European Football Championship, which was played in Sweden. Her sister Carina Jaarnek (1962–2016) was also a singer.

Discography

Studio albums

Singles

Svensktoppen songs

References 

1965 births
Swedish women singers
Living people
Melodifestivalen contestants of 2002
Melodifestivalen contestants of 1991